Trachypleura is an extinct genus of polyplacophoran molluscs. Trachypleura became extinct during the Triassic period.

References 

Prehistoric chiton genera
Triassic animals